Telemundo was the first television channel broadcasting telenovelas, and Univision soon followed in the 1990s. Over the years, these two television networks have made co-productions with other countries including Venezuela, México, Colombia and Chile. Telemundo and Univision are sister channels with Venevisión and Televen, Venezuelan channels that have broadcast and produced their telenovelas for many years. Caracol Televisión is another sister channel of Telemundo.

Below is a list of all the telenovelas produced by Telemundo and Univision:

1980s

1990s

2000s

2010s

See also 
List of telenovelas of Telemundo
List of telenovelas of Univision

References

External links 

Telenovelas

Dynamic lists
American
American telenovelas